Mount Thrace is a peak rising to 1800 m at the southeast side of Mount Boreas, Olympus Range, in the McMurdo Dry Valleys. It is connected by a ridge to the Mount Boreas massif. In association with the names of figures in Greek mythology grouped in the range, named by Advisory Committee on Antarctic Names (US-ACAN) (2004) after Thrace, legendary home of Boreas (Mount Boreas, q.v.).

Mountains of Victoria Land
McMurdo Dry Valleys